Carney is an Irish surname. Notable people with the surname include:

 Alan Carney (1909–1973), American actor and comedian
 Art Carney (1918–2003), American actor best known for playing Ed Norton on The Honeymooners
 Augustus Carney (1870–1920), American actor
 Charles J. Carney (1913–1987), United States Congressman and Ohio state senator
 Charles Carney (Jacobite) (-1693), an Irish soldier of the 17th century
 Brian Carney (rugby) (born 1976), Irish rugby league and rugby union footballer
 Brian Carney (editorialist), American journalist 
 Chris Carney (born 1959), American politician, Democratic congressman from Pennsylvania's 10th district
 Dan and Frank Carney, American businessmen, founders of Pizza Hut
 Daniel Carney (1944–1987), Rhodesian novelist
 David Carney (born 1983), Australian footballer
 Gene Carney (1895–1952), English footballer
 Harry Carney (1910–1974), American jazz musician
 Jack Carney (baseball) (1866–1925), American professional baseball player
 Jay Carney (born 1965), White House Press Secretary
 Jeffrey Carney, former United States Air Force intelligence specialist convicted of spying for East Germany
 John Carney (American football) (born 1964), American football placekicker
 John Carney (director) (born 1972), Irish film and TV director
 John Carney (magician) (born 1958), American sleight-of-hand artist, author and actor
 John "Bam" Carney (born 1969), American politician, member of the Kentucky House of Representatives
 John Carney (born 1956), American politician, former  U.S. Representative and current Governor of Delaware
 Julia Carney (1823–1908; pseudonym, "Minnie May"), American educator, poet
 Justin Carney (born 1988), Australian rugby league footballer
 Karen Carney (born 1987), English football player
 Keith Carney (born 1970), American ice hockey player
 Mark Carney (born 1965), former governor of the Bank of England, and the Bank of Canada
 Pat Carney (born 1935), Canadian senator
 Patrick Carney (born 1980), American drummer of The Black Keys
 Ralph Carney (born 1956), American musician
 Reeve Carney (born 1983), American musician and actor
 Rodney Carney (born 1984), American basketball player
 Ray Carney, American film theoretician
 Scott Carney (born 1978)  American investigative journalist
 Steve Carney (1957–2013), English footballer
 Susan M. Carney (born 1962), American jurist
 Thomas Carney (1824–1888), 2nd Governor of Kansas
 Todd Carney (born 1986), Australian rugby league footballer
 William Carney (1942–2017), American member of the United States House of Representatives from New York
 William Harvey Carney (1840–1908), American Civil War soldier and the first African American to earn the Medal of Honor
 Robert Carney (1895–1990) American U. S. Navy admiral and Chief of Naval Operations (1953–1955)

See also
Governor Carney (disambiguation)

Anglicised Irish-language surnames